The BBC News at Nine (currently styled as BBC News at 9) is a morning news programme. It aired every Sunday to Friday on BBC Two and the BBC News Channel for 60 minutes from 9am until 10am. On weekends, it was replaced by a standard edition of BBC World News. The programme was presented by Victoria Derbyshire, Annita McVeigh, and Ben Brown.

Presenters
 

Annita McVeigh, Rebecca Jones and Joanna Gosling appear as relief presenters. Victoria Derbyshire, Geeta Guru-Murthy, Ben Brown, Ben Thompson, Victoria Valentine, Luxmy Gopal, Ben Boulos and Kasia Madera also appear as backup relief presenters.

Evening bulletin
An evening (9 p.m.) bulletin also named BBC News at Nine was broadcast, starting in 2013.

The weather and business updates were generally presented from the screen away from the main desk, unless they preceded each other. Sports updates were presented from the BBC Sport Centre at MediaCityUK, Salford. From 30 June 2014, the programme aired an extended Weather for the Week Ahead at 9.55 p.m. This looked at the weather, generally over the British Isles, over the next seven days.

On Fridays from 9:45 p.m., the programme Newswatch used to air. This was moved to a slightly earlier timeslot, 9.30 p.m.-9.45 p.m., and now airs on Friday evenings generally at 8.45 p.m., with overnight repeats on Friday nights/Saturday morning and during the BBC Breakfast programme on Saturday morning, simulcast on BBC One. Newswatch features viewer opinions and criticisms on how BBC News has covered news events during the week. On Friday night, a repeat of The Film Review follows. It is presented by the anchor of the BBC News at Five and a film critic, usually Mark Kermode, from the Studio C (BBC World News' main studio) with the background and lighting changed to resemble a cinema effect. It features reviews of all the week's main releases.

This evening bulletin was ended on 31 May 2015, and replaced by Outside Source and a new edition of World News Today.

References

External links
 

2020s British television series
2013 British television series debuts
BBC television news shows
BBC New Media